Bootle by-election may refer to one of three parliamentary by-elections held for the British House of Commons constituency of Bootle, in Merseyside:

1911 Bootle by-election
May 1990 Bootle by-election
November 1990 Bootle by-election

See also
Bootle (UK Parliament constituency)